El final del paraíso is an American telenovela produced by Telemundo Global Studios and Fox Telecolombia for Telemundo that premiered on 13 August 2019 on Telemundo, and ended on 9 December 2019. This series is produced in Colombia and Las Vegas and it was announced as a spin-off of the franchise Sin senos sí hay paraíso created by Gustavo Bolívar. Carmen Villalobos, Fabián Ríos, Catherine Siachoque, Gregorio Pernía reprise their roles from previous series and also has the participation of Kimberly Reyes, who replaced Majida Issa in the character of La Diabla.

Unlike its original broadcast, Netflix released the series with a total of 90 episodes, and with a totally different ending to the one broadcast by Telemundo. Thus leaving an open ending to produce a new season, a fact that Telemundo did not confirm.

Plot 
Two years later, Catalina, la grande (Carmen Villalobos) assumes her new duties and responsibilities as the new director of the DEA in Colombia, her daughter Mariana (Stephania Duque), El Titi (Gregorio Pernía) and Dayana (Elianis Garrido) they have associated with Yésica Beltrán (Kimberly Reyes), their worst enemy, whose ambitions are increasingly dangerous. This time it was devastating to return with a formidable weapon since La Diabla has a new face thanks to a total face transplant. This finally manages to infiltrate the organization of the DEA precisely with the help of Mano Negra (Juan Pablo Gamboa). Without knowing it, Catalina Santana works hand-in-hand with Yésica but who presents herself under a new identity, that of Valeria Montes with the aim of slowly destroying her to end the growing rivalry that has existed between them for three decades.

Meanwhile, Catalina, la grande will have to fight against the world of drug trafficking and a new cartel of criminals who threaten to flood the country with a new synthetic drug that will trigger a war between good and evil that will put Catalina's world to the test and of all those around her, like her friends Paola (Alejandra Pinzón) and Vanessa (Estefanía Gómez), recruited from the DEA. In addition, Catalina, la grande will be cornered by Zoraya Fuentes (Eileen Roca), who became Ingrid Román regarding her husband Santiago (Roberto Manrique), who is unjustly in jail because of Zoraya.

On the other hand, calm finally comes to Catalina, la mediana (Carolina Gaitán) and Hernán Darío (Juan Pablo Urrego) after losing their child.

Cast and characters

Main characters 
 Carmen Villalobos as Catalina Santana
 Catherine Siachoque as Hilda Santana
 Fabián Ríos as Albeiro Marín
 Gregorio Pernía as Aurelio Jaramillo "El Titi"
 Kimberly Reyes as Yésica Beltrán "La Diabla" / Valeria Montes
 Carolina Gaitán as Catalina Marín
 Juan Pablo Urrego as Hernán Darío
 Juan Pablo Gamboa as Mano Negra
 Roberto Manrique as Santiago Sanín
 Francisco Bolívar as José Luis Vargas "Jota"
 Mauricio Cujar as Edmundo Dorantes "Sombra"
 Stephanía Duque as Mariana Sanín
 Elianis Garrido as Dayana Muriel "La Demonia"
 Estefanía Gómez as Vanessa Salazar
 Linda Baldrich as Natalia Bérmudez
 Manuel Gómez as Esteban Calvo
 Alejandra Pinzón as Paola Pizarro
 Martín Karpan as Salvatore Miranda
 Mauricio Mauad as Ramón Montecarlo "Moncho"
 Juan Pablo Llano as Daniel Cerón
 Leonardo Acosta as Alfonso Berrio
 Alejandro Martínez as Roberto Conde

Recurring characters 
 Giancarlo de Sousa as Michael Rubens
 Juan David Galindo as Rocco Candela
 Ricardo Leguízamo as Álvaro Mendieta
 Margarita Reyes as Pilar
 Gloria Pinilla as Mirta Muriel
 Margarita Torres as Lizeth Muriel
 Alejandra Monsalve as Sandra
 Alí Humar as Pablo Morón
 Carlos Baez Carvajal as Young Sebastián Sanín

Television ratings 
 
}}
Notes

Episodes

References

External links 
 

Sin senos sí hay paraíso
2019 telenovelas
Telemundo telenovelas
2019 American television series debuts
2019 American television series endings
2019 Colombian television series debuts
2019 Colombian television series endings
Television series produced by Fox Telecolombia
Colombian telenovelas
Works about Colombian drug cartels